In fluid dynamics, a flow with periodic variations is known as pulsatile flow, or as Womersley flow. The flow profiles was first derived by John R. Womersley (1907–1958) in his work with blood flow in arteries. The cardiovascular system of chordate animals is a very good example where pulsatile flow is found, but pulsatile flow is also observed in engines and hydraulic systems, as a result of rotating mechanisms pumping the fluid.

Equation 

The pulsatile flow profile is given in a straight pipe by

where:
{|
|-
|  || is the longitudinal flow velocity,
|-
|  || is the radial coordinate,
|-
|  || is time,
|-
|  || is the dimensionless Womersley number,
|-
|  || is the angular frequency of the first harmonic of a Fourier series of an oscillatory pressure gradient,
|-
|  || are the natural numbers,
|-
|  || is the pressure gradient magnitude for the frequency ,
|-
|  || is the fluid density,
|-
|  || is the dynamic viscosity,
|-
|  || is the pipe radius,
|-
|  || is the Bessel function  of first kind and order zero,
|-
|  ||is the imaginary number, and
|-
| } ||is the real part of a complex number.
|}

Properties

Womersley number 
The pulsatile flow profile changes its shape depending on the Womersley number

For , viscous forces dominate the flow, and the pulse is considered quasi-static with a parabolic profile.
For , the inertial forces are dominant in the central core, whereas viscous forces dominate near the boundary layer. Thus, the velocity profile gets flattened, and phase between the pressure and velocity waves gets shifted towards the core.

Function limits

Lower limit 

The Bessel function at its lower limit becomes

which converges to the Hagen-Poiseuille flow profile for steady flow for

or to a quasi-static pulse with parabolic profile when

In this case, the function is real, because the pressure and velocity waves are in phase.

Upper limit 

The Bessel function at its upper limit becomes

which converges to

This is highly reminiscent of the Stokes layer on an oscillating flat plate, or the skin-depth penetration of an alternating magnetic field into an electrical conductor.
On the surface , but the exponential term becomes negligible once  becomes large, the velocity profile becomes almost constant and independent of the viscosity. Thus, the flow simply oscillates as a plug profile in time according to the pressure gradient,

However, close to the walls, in a layer of thickness , the velocity adjusts rapidly to zero. Furthermore, the phase of the time oscillation varies quickly with position across the layer. The exponential decay of the higher frequencies is faster.

Derivation 

For deriving the analytical solution of this non-stationary flow velocity profile, the following assumptions are taken:
 Fluid is homogeneous, incompressible and Newtonian;
 Tube wall is rigid and circular;
 Motion is laminar, axisymmetric and parallel to the tube's axis;
 Boundary conditions are: axisymmetry at the centre, and no-slip condition on the wall;
 Pressure gradient is a periodic function that drives the fluid;
 Gravitation has no effect on the fluid.

Thus, the Navier-Stokes equation and the continuity equation are simplified as

and

respectively. The pressure gradient driving the pulsatile flow is decomposed in Fourier series,

Note that,  (standing for ) is the steady-state pressure gradient, whose sign is opposed to the steady-state velocity (i.e., a negative pressure gradient yields positive flow). Similarly, the velocity profile is also decomposed in Fourier series in phase with the pressure gradient, because the fluid is incompressible,

where  are the amplitudes of each harmonic of the periodic function, and the steady component is simply Poiseuille flow

Thus, the Navier-Stokes equation for each harmonic reads as

With the boundary conditions satisfied, the general solution of this ordinary differential equation for the oscillatory part is

The axisymetic boundary condition is applied to show that  for the derivative of above equation to be valid, as the derivatives  and  approach infinity. Next, the wall non-slip boundary condition yields . Hence, the amplitudes of the velocity profile of the harmonic  becomes

where  is used for simplification.
The velocity profile itself is obtained by taking the real part of the complex function resulted from the summation of all harmonics of the pulse,

Flow rate 
Flow rate is obtained by integrating the velocity field on the cross-section. Since,

then

Velocity profile

To compare the shape of the velocity profile, it can be assumed that

where

is the shape function.
It is important to notice that this formulation ignores the inertial effects. The velocity profile approximates a parabolic profile or a plug profile, for low or high Womersley numbers, respectively.

Wall shear stress 
For straight pipes, wall shear stress is

The derivative of a Bessel function is

Hence,

Centre line velocity 
If the pressure gradient  is not measured, it can still be obtained by measuring the velocity at the centre line. The measured velocity has only the real part of the full expression in the form of

Noting that , the full physical expression becomes

at the centre line. The measured velocity is compared with the full expression by applying some properties of complex number. Hence,

and

which finally yield

See also 
 Cardiovascular system
 Hemodynamics
 Womersley number
 Fluid hammer

References 

Biological engineering
Cardiovascular physiology
Fluid dynamics